The Cathedral of All Souls, also referred to as All Souls Cathedral, is an Episcopal cathedral located in Asheville, North Carolina, United States of America.  All Souls was built by George Washington Vanderbilt II, the grandson of railroad baron, Cornelius Vanderbilt, in 1896, to serve as the local parish church for Biltmore Village, which had been developed near his Biltmore Estate.  The Right Reverend José Antonio McLoughlin is the current bishop seated at the cathedral.

History
The church was established in 1896 as a member of the Episcopal Diocese of Western North Carolina. It is a member of the worldwide Anglican Communion. The Church and Parish Hall were commissioned by George Vanderbilt and designed by Richard Morris Hunt, the architect of Vanderbilt's Biltmore Estate.

The chancel organ was installed by the Casavant Frères organ company of Canada in 1971. The Cathedral of All Souls was designated as the cathedral of the Episcopal Diocese of Western North Carolina on January 1, 1995. The Right Reverend José A. McLoughlin is the current bishop.

Stained glass artists Maitland Armstrong and Helen Maitland Armstrong created three memorial stained glass windows for the south transept, honoring Maria Louisa Vanderbilt (George W. Vanderbilt's mother), architect Richard Morris Hunt, and Clarence Barker (Vanderbilt's cousin). They later created "Ecce Homo," a stained glass memorial at All Souls' Church in Biltmore, for Cornelius Vanderbilt, in 1900.

The church and its parish house was added to the National Register of Historic Places in 1979 as All Souls Episcopal Church and Parish House.

Gallery

See also
List of the Episcopal cathedrals of the United States
List of cathedrals in the United States

References

External links
 Official site

Churches on the National Register of Historic Places in North Carolina
All Souls
Episcopal church buildings in North Carolina
Religious organizations established in 1896
Churches completed in 1896
19th-century Episcopal church buildings
Churches in Asheville, North Carolina
Anglo-Catholic church buildings in the United States
National Register of Historic Places in Buncombe County, North Carolina
Anglo-Catholic cathedrals
Cathedrals in North Carolina